Santa Rosa de Copán Airport  was an airport formerly serving Santa Rosa de Copán, a municipality in Copán Department, Honduras.

The Google Earth Historical Imagery (10/17/2007)  image shows buildings covering the western half of the  gravel runway. Current aerial imagery (11/21/2017) shows the runway completely built over.

See also

 Transport in Honduras
 List of airports in Honduras

References

External links
OpenStreetMap - Santa Rosa de Copán

Defunct airports
Airports in Honduras
Copán Department